Burton K. Wheeler (1882–1975) was a U.S. Senator from Montana from 1923 to 1947. Senator Wheeler may also refer to:

Charles Wheeler (politician) (born 1926), Missouri State Senate
Clayton L. Wheeler (1876–1950), New York State Senate
Edwin Wheeler (1828–1864), Wisconsin State Senate
Grattan H. Wheeler (1783–1852), New York State Senate
Hamilton K. Wheeler (1848–1918), Illinois State Senate
Harrison H. Wheeler (1839–1896), Michigan State Senate
Hoyt Henry Wheeler (1833–1906), Vermont State Senate
Jonas Wheeler (1789–1826), Maine State Senate
Katie Wheeler (born 1940), New Hampshire State Senate
Nathaniel Wheeler (1820–1893), Connecticut State Senate
Osmer B. Wheeler (1809–1906), New York State Senate
Thomas J. Wheeler (1803–1875), New York State Senate
William A. Wheeler (1819–1887), New York State Senate